Asram (also known as Asrem) is a village in Kuhdasht-e Sharqi Rural District, in the Central District of Miandorud region, Mazandaran Province, Iran. At the 2006 census, its population was 4,478, in 1,147 families.

References 

Populated places in Miandorud County